Kiviuq (also spelled "Qiviuq", "Kiviok" and other variants) is a legendary hero of the epic stories of the Inuit of the Arctic regions of northern Canada, Alaska and Greenland.

Kiviuq is an eternal Inuit wanderer. Spirits, giants, cannibals, bears and sea monsters intermingle in Kiviuq's world, creating havoc for him. He walks, or travels by dog sled, kayak (qajaq), or may be borne by huge fishes. His supernatural powers allow him to overcome all manner of obstacles in his travels across the north.

Stories about Kiviuq's many adventures appear in Inuit culture across the Arctic. Kiviuq has lived a long time and has had many lives. Versions of his adventures vary with the location and the storyteller. In Greenland he is known as "Qooqa" and in Alaska he is called "Qayaq". Qayaq is short for Qayaqtuaġiŋñaqtuaq  - 'He who shall always long to go roaming in his qayaq').

Franz Boas
Franz Boas identified the Kiviuk legend as one of the best known of the circumpolar Inuit adventure hunter-hero-traveler legends.

Versions of the legend

One well-known legend of Kiviuq tells of his friendship with the grandson of an old woman. Everyone abuses and makes fun of the boy except Kiviuq. The old woman decides to get revenge. She changes her grandson into a seal and has him swim out to sea. The men follow the seal, intending to hunt it. Before the hunters reach it, however, the old woman creates a storm and drowns everyone but the seal and Kiviuq. The seal swims safely back to shore, where the old woman turns him back into a boy. Kiviuq drifts away in his kayak continuing his adventures and living with people of many foreign lands.

Netsilik
In a story from the Netsilik people, the world ends when Kiviuq's face transforms completely into stone. Currently, after about 100 years of change, his face is half stone.

Inuit elders say that he is in his last life now, on an adventure somewhere. However, before he dies he will return to see his people. Oral tradition has preserved many versions of the Kiviuq story-cycle, and today, a new generation of Inuit storytellers is bringing the tales to life in written or graphic form.

Qikiqtaarjuk, once a Hudson Bay island and now a peninsula, is associated with Kiviuq.

Kivalliq
In the Kivalliq Region, the story tells of an orphan boy who lived with his grandmother. The boy would be teased and bullied every day by other boys. He would go home crying every day with ripped clothes. His poor grandmother would have to sew perfectly good clothes every day with her poor eyesight. She grew tired of all the bullying her grandson went through that she had a plan.

There was a seal that had been caught for them as they couldn't provide for themselves. With that seal, she asked her grandson to skin it carefully and not to puncture any holes in the skin. So as she said, the boy skinned it carefully and with no punctures. Then she asked him to put the skin on and make sure he could see through the little eye holes as if he were a seal. He followed her instructions, then he was asked to put his head in a pail of water and stay in there until he needed  to breathe again. So the boy did as his grandmother asked and after he did it, he had to do it over and over until he could stay in the water so long that the sun had moved when he finally comes up for air. The grandmother was so satisfied that she told him to secretly go into the water with the seal skin on and get the mean boys to notice him as if he were a seal. After he gets noticed, he had to lure them out to the ocean. The boy did what his grandmother told him to do. The mean boys noticed him and thought he was a seal. Among the mean boys were Kiviuq and his brother.

After he lured them out to sea, they say he waved his arms and legs and cried as if he was a baby and asked for the wind to come. It is believed that when you were born and whatever the weather is on that day, it belongs to you. So in this case, the boy called for the wind and it came to him drowning all the mean boys but Kiviuq.

Kiviuq was a strong boy; he fought and fought against the waves. He did this for many days until he found land. It is believed that he is still out there living, so old that he is hard as stone, but his heart is still beating. If his heart stops beating, they say the world will end.

In Inuit art
The Kiviok legend is depicted in numerous works by Canadian Inuit artists such as Jessie Oonark (1906-1985) and her daughters, Janet Kigusiuq, Victoria Mamnguqsualuk, and Miriam Marealik Qiyuk.

Kigusiuq and Mamnguqsllaluk learned the stories from their grandparents in the 1930s and 1940s. Oonark's mother and father and her mother-in-law Naatak, were storytellers who shared them with their grandchildren. Oonark's well-known drawing and 1970 print by the same name–"Dream of the Bird Woman"–refers to the Kiviuq (Qiviuk)., an Inuk who faced dangerous obstacles in his journeys by kayak, which was described by Franz Boas as the most widely known Inuit legend in the circumpolar region.

References

Further reading

External links 
 Kiviuq's Journey stories from Inuit Elders across Nunavut (in English and Inuktitut) at the Wayback Machine

Inuit mythology